Paul Kuhn may refer to:

 Paul Kuhn (tenor) (1874–1966), German operatic tenor
 Paul Kuhn (band leader) (1928–2013), German jazz musician and band leader

See also
 Paul Kuën (1910–1997), German operatic tenor
 Paul Kühnle (1885–1970), German international footballer